The Almendares River is a river that runs for 47 km in the western part of Cuba. It originates from the east of Tapaste and flows north-west into the Straits of Florida. The river acts as a water supply for Havana.

The final stretch divides the municipalities of Plaza de la Revolución (Vedado district) and Playa (Miramar district). Part of the river valley forms the Almendares Park or Metropolitan Park of Havana (PMH), a few kilometers upstream from the ocean.

History 

The Cuban aborigines called it Casiguaguas, and the first colonizers named it La Chorrera, and later renamed it Almendares in honor of the Bishop of Havana, Enrique Almendaris.

Gallery

References

Further reading
 Jacobo de la Pezuela: Diccionario geografico, estadístico, historico, de la isla de Cuba.Editor: Impr. del estab. de Mellado, 1863. Tomo II, página 236 (PDF).
 Gerardo Gandarilla, Tomado del Trabajo “Historia del Wajay”, Biblioteca “Ramón Herrera (Wajay).
 Gerardo Gandarilla, Tomado del Trabajo “Los Manantiales de Vento”, Biblioteca “Ramón Herrera (Wajay).
 Albear y Fernández de Lara, Francisco de: “Memoria sobre el proyecto de conducción a La Habana de las aguas de los manantiales de Vento” -1855-.
 Albear y Fernández de Lara, Francisco de: “Memoria del proyecto de depósito de recepción y de distribución de las aguas del Canal de Vento”,-1876-.
Albear y Fernández de Lara, Francisco de: “Memoria del proyecto de la distribución del agua de Vento en La Habana” -1876-.
Albear y Fernández de Lara, Francisco de:“Acueducto de Albear”.
Antonio Núñez Jiménez “Hacia una Cultura de La Naturaleza” (PDF)
Investigación: “USO DE TÉCNICAS NUCLEARES EN LA EVALUACIÓN DE LA CUENCA ALMENDARES-VENTO PARA LA GESTIÓN SOSTENIBLE DE SUS RECURSOS HÍDRICOS”. Autores: José Luis Peralta Vital; Reinaldo Gil Castillo; Dennys Leyva Bombuse; Leslie Moleiro León y Manuel Pin (PDF).

Rivers of Cuba